Mateika or Mateiko is an uninhabited islet of Funafuti, Tuvalu.

See also

 Desert island
 List of islands

References

Uninhabited islands of Tuvalu
Pacific islands claimed under the Guano Islands Act
Funafuti